Nargandal (also Romanized as Nārgandal; also known as Na‘l Kandal, Nālgand, Nālgandeh, and Nālkandar) is a village in Afriz Rural District, Sedeh District, Qaen County, South Khorasan Province, Iran. At the 2006 census, its population was 78, in 23 families.

References 

Populated places in Qaen County